Nam Định station is one of the main railway stations on the North–South railway (Reunification Express) in Vietnam. It serves the city of Nam Định.

Railway stations in Vietnam
Nam Định
Buildings and structures in Nam Định province